Geastrum aculeatum is a species of mushroom belonging to the genus Geastrum, or earthstar fungi. It is found in eastern Brazil.

References 

aculeatum
Fungi described in 2013